Jamileh Sheykhi (30 April 1930 – 23 May 2001) was an Iranian actress and the mother of actor Atila Pesyani.

Career 
She made her stage debut in 1957 and began film acting with Shipwreck (1975, Nosrat Karimi). As a pioneer and veteran character actress of Iranian theatre and cinema, she performed in a number of films with reputable directors. Sheykhi had a distinguished screen appearance in Travellers (1991, Bahram Bayzai) and won the Best Actress award at the International Fajr Film Festival.

Selected filmography 
 Visa
 The Little Bird of Happiness, 1987
 Mosāferan (Travellers), 1992, directed by Bahram Bayzai
 Leila, 1996, directed by Dariush Mehrjoui
 Kaghaz-e Bi Khatt (Unruled Paper), 2001, directed by Naser Taghvai

References

External links 

 Jamileh Sheykhi's photograph:  
 Photograph of Jamileh Sheykhi's grave:  

1930 births
2001 deaths
People from Zanjan, Iran
Iranian film actresses
Iranian stage actresses
Iranian television actresses
Crystal Simorgh for Best Actress winners
Burials at artist's block of Behesht-e Zahra
Crystal Simorgh for Best Supporting Actress winners